IEEE/ACM Transactions on Networking is a bimonthly peer-reviewed scientific journal covering communication networks. It is published by the IEEE Communications Society, the IEEE Computer Society, and the ACM Special Interest Group on Data Communications. The current editor-in-chief is Sanjay Shakkottai (University of Texas). The previous editor-in-chief was Ness B. Shroff (Ohio State University). According to the Journal Citation Reports, the journal has a 2016 impact factor of 3.376.

References

External links 
 

Computer science journals
Transactions on Networking
English-language journals
Transactions on Networking
Bimonthly journals
Publications established in 1993